Sarrud may refer to:
 Sarrud-e Olya
 Sarrud-e Sofla
 Sarrud-e Jonubi Rural District
 Sarrud-e Shomali Rural District